Boner may refer to:

People with the name
 Boner (surname)

Arts, entertainment, and media
 Boner Records, a California-based independent label
 Boner Stabone, a recurring character on the TV series Growing Pains
 Boner's Ark, a comic strip about a sailing ship filled with animals

Other uses
 Boner, a slang term for an erection
 Boner, a slang term for an error
 Boner, a United States Department of Agriculture carcass grade for slaughter cattle

See also 
 
 Blooper (disambiguation)
 Blunder (disambiguation)
 Bonar (disambiguation)
 Bone (disambiguation)
 Bones (disambiguation)